I Don't Trust Myself may refer to:
"I Don't Trust Myself", a song by Sara Evans from the album Words
"I Don't Trust Myself", a song by Willie Dixon from the album Hidden Charms
"I Don't Trust Myself (With Loving You)", a song by John Mayer from the album Continuum